Tăcuta is a commune in Vaslui County, Western Moldavia, Romania. It is composed of seven villages: Cujba, Dumasca, Focșeasca, Mircești, Protopopești, Sofieni and Tăcuta.

References

Communes in Vaslui County
Localities in Western Moldavia